Peter Erkelenz (12 September 1897 – April 1966) was a German film actor.

Selected filmography
 Men Behind Bars (1931)
 The Sea Ghost (1931)
 Sacred Waters (1932)
 Dream of the Rhine (1933)
 The Star of Valencia (1933)
 A Door Opens (1933)
 The Four Musketeers (1934)
 Hundred Days (1935)
 The Empress's Favourite (1936)
 Ninety Minute Stopover (1936)
 The Deruga Case (1938)

References

External links
 

1897 births
1966 deaths
German male film actors
20th-century German male actors
Place of birth missing
Place of death missing
Date of death missing